The Balto-Slavic languages form a branch of the Indo-European family of languages, traditionally comprising the Baltic and Slavic languages. Baltic and Slavic languages share several linguistic traits not found in any other Indo-European branch, which points to a period of common development and origin. 

A Proto-Balto-Slavic language is reconstructable by the comparative method, descending from Proto-Indo-European by means of well-defined sound laws, and from which modern Slavic and Baltic languages descended. One particularly innovative dialect separated from the Balto-Slavic dialect continuum and became ancestral to the Proto-Slavic language, from which all Slavic languages descended.

While the notion of a Balto-Slavic unity was previously contested largely due to political controversies, there is a general consensus among academic specialists in Indo-European linguistics to classify Baltic and Slavic languages into a single branch, with only some minor details of the nature of their relationship remaining in contention.

Historical dispute
The nature of the relationship of the Balto-Slavic languages has been the subject of much discussion from the very beginning of historical Indo-European linguistics as a scientific discipline. A few are more intent on explaining the similarities between the two groups not in terms of a linguistically "genetic" relationship, but by language contact and dialectal closeness in the Proto-Indo-European period.

Baltic and Slavic share many close phonological, lexical, morphosyntactic and accentological similarities (listed below). The early Indo-Europeanists Rasmus Rask and August Schleicher (1861) proposed a simple solution: From Proto-Indo-European descended Balto-German-Slavonic language, out of which Proto-Balto-Slavic (later split into Proto-Baltic and Proto-Slavic) and Germanic emerged. Schleicher's proposal was taken up and refined by Karl Brugmann, who listed eight innovations as evidence for a Balto-Slavic branch in the Grundriss der vergleichenden Grammatik der indogermanischen Sprachen ("Outline of the Comparative Grammar of the Indo-Germanic Languages"). The Latvian linguist Jānis Endzelīns thought, however, that any similarities among Baltic and Slavic languages resulted from intensive language contact, i.e. that they were not genetically more closely related and that there was no common Proto-Balto-Slavic language. Antoine Meillet (1905, 1908, 1922, 1925, 1934), a French linguist, in reaction to Brugmann's hypothesis, propounded a view according to which all similarities of Baltic and Slavic occurred accidentally, by independent parallel development, and that there was no Proto-Balto-Slavic language. In turn, the Polish linguist Rozwadowski suggests that the similarities among Baltic and Slavic languages are a result of both a genetic relationship and later language contact. Thomas Olander corroborates the claim of genetic relationship in his research in the field of comparative Balto-Slavic accentology.

Even though some linguists still reject a genetic relationship, most scholars accept that Baltic and Slavic languages experienced a period of common development. This view is also reflected in most modern standard textbooks on Indo-European linguistics. Gray and Atkinson's (2003) application of language-tree divergence analysis supports a genetic relationship between the Baltic and Slavic languages, dating the split of the family to about 1400 BCE.

Internal classification
The traditional division into two distinct sub-branches (i.e. Slavic and Baltic) is mostly upheld by scholars who accept Balto-Slavic as a genetic branch of Indo-European. There is a general consensus that the Baltic languages can be divided into East Baltic (Lithuanian, Latvian) and West Baltic (Old Prussian). The internal diversity of Baltic points at a much greater time-depth for the breakup of the Baltic languages in comparison to the Slavic languages.

"Traditional" Balto-Slavic tree model

This bipartite division into Baltic and Slavic was first challenged in the 1960s, when Vladimir Toporov and Vyacheslav Ivanov observed that the apparent difference between the "structural models" of the Baltic languages and the Slavic languages is the result of the innovative nature of Proto-Slavic, and that the latter had evolved from an earlier stage which conformed to the more archaic "structural model" of the Proto-Baltic dialect continuum. Frederik Kortlandt (1977, 2018) has proposed that West Baltic and East Baltic are in fact not more closely related to each other than either of them is related to Slavic, and Balto-Slavic therefore can be split into three equidistant branches: East Baltic, West Baltic and Slavic.

Alternative Balto-Slavic tree model

Although supported by a number of scholars, Kortlandt's hypothesis is still a minority view. Some scholars accept Kortlandt's division into three branches as the default assumption, but nevertheless believe that there is sufficient evidence to unite East Baltic and West Baltic in an intermediate Baltic node.

The tripartite split is supported by glottochronologic studies by V. V. Kromer, whereas two computer-generated family trees (from the early 2000s) that include Old Prussian have a Baltic node parallel to the Slavic node.

Historical expansion
The sudden expansion of Proto-Slavic in the sixth and the seventh century (around 600 CE, uniform Proto-Slavic with no detectable dialectal differentiation was spoken from Thessaloniki in Greece to Novgorod in Russia) is, according to some, connected to the hypothesis that Proto-Slavic was in fact a koiné of the Avar state, i.e. the language of the administration and military rule of the Avar Khaganate in Eastern Europe. In 626, the Slavs, Persians and Avars jointly attacked the Byzantine Empire and participated in the Siege of Constantinople. In that campaign, the Slavs fought under Avar officers. There is an ongoing controversy over whether the Slavs might then have been a military caste under the khaganate rather than an ethnicity. Their language—at first possibly only one local speech—once koinéized, became a lingua franca of the Avar state. This might explain how Proto-Slavic spread to the Balkans and the areas of the Danube basin, and would also explain why the Avars were assimilated so fast, leaving practically no linguistic traces, and that Proto-Slavic was so unusually uniform. However, such a theory fails to explain how Slavic spread to Eastern Europe, an area that had no historical links with the Avar Khanate. That said, the Avar state was later replaced by the definitively Slavic state of Great Moravia, which could have played the same role.

It is also likely that the expansion of Slavic occurred with the assimilation of Iranic-speaking groups such as the Sarmatians, who quickly adopted Proto-Slavic due to speaking related Indo-European satem languages, in much the same way Latin expanded by assimilating the Celtic speakers in continental Western Europe and the Dacians.

That sudden expansion of Proto-Slavic erased most of the idioms of the Balto-Slavic dialect continuum, which left us today with only two groups, Baltic and Slavic (or East Baltic, West Baltic, and Slavic in the minority view). This secession of the Balto-Slavic dialect ancestral to Proto-Slavic is estimated on archaeological and glottochronological criteria to have occurred sometime in the period 1500–1000 BCE. Hydronymic evidence suggests that Baltic languages were once spoken in much wider territory than the one they cover today, all the way to Moscow, and were later replaced by Slavic.

Shared features of the Balto-Slavic languages
The degree of relationship of the Baltic and Slavic languages is indicated by a series of common innovations not shared with other Indo-European languages, and by the relative chronology of these innovations which can be established. The Baltic and Slavic languages also share some inherited words. These are either not found at all in other Indo-European languages (except when borrowed) or are inherited from Proto-Indo-European but have undergone identical changes in meaning when compared to other Indo-European languages. This indicates that the Baltic and Slavic languages share a period of common development, the Proto-Balto-Slavic language.

Common sound changes
 Winter's law: lengthening of vowels before Proto-Indo-European (PIE) non-breathy voiced consonants (*b, *d, *g).
 PIE breathy-voiced consonants (*bʰ, *dʰ, *gʰ, *ǵʰ) merge into plain voiced consonants (*b, *d, *g, *ǵ). This also occurred in several other Indo-European branches, but as Winter's law was sensitive to the difference between the two types of consonants, the merger must have happened after it and so is a specific Balto-Slavic innovation.
 Hirt's law: retraction of the PIE accent to the preceding syllable, if that syllable ended in a laryngeal (*h₁, *h₂, *h₃, see Laryngeal theory).
 A high vowel is inserted before PIE syllabic sonorants (*l̥, *r̥, *m̥, *n̥). This vowel is usually *i (giving *il, *ir, *im, *in) but in some occasions also *u (*ul, *ur, *um, *un). Proto-Germanic is the only other Indo-European language that inserts a high vowel (*u in all cases), all others insert mid or low vowels instead.
 Emergence of a register distinction on long syllables, between acute (probably glottalized) and circumflex. The acute arose primarily when the syllable ended in a PIE voiced consonant (as in Winter's law) or when it ended in a laryngeal. The distinction is reflected in most Balto-Slavic languages, including Proto-Slavic, as an opposition between rising and falling tone on accented syllables. Some Baltic languages directly reflect the acute register in the form of a so-called "broken tone".
 Shortening of vowels before word-final *m.
 Word-final *-mi > *-m after a long vowel. This followed the preceding change, as the preceding long vowel is retained.
 Raising of stressed *o to *u in a final syllable.
 Merging of PIE short *o and *a into *a. This change also occurred in several other Indo-European branches, but here too it must have happened after Winter's law: Winter's law lengthens *o to *ō and *a to *ā, and must therefore have occurred before the two sounds merged. It also followed the raising of *o to *u above. In the Slavic languages, *a is later rounded to *o, while the Baltic languages keep *a:
 Lithuanian ašìs Old Church Slavonic ось (from PIE *a: Latin axis, Ancient Greek áxōn)
 Lithuanian avìs, Old Church Slavonic овьца (from PIE *o: Latin ovis, Greec óis)

Common Balto-Slavic innovations include several other changes, which are also shared by several other Indo-European branches. These are therefore not direct evidence for the existence of a common Balto-Slavic family, but they do corroborate it.

 Satemization: The PIE palatovelar consonants *ḱ, *ǵ, *ǵʰ become palatal sibilants *ś, *ź, *ź, while the PIE labiovelar consonants *kʷ, *gʷ, *gʷʰ lose their labialization and merge with the plain velar *k, *g, *gʰ. The palatal sibilants later become plain sibilants *s, *z in all Balto-Slavic languages except Lithuanian.
 Ruki sound law: *s becomes *š when preceded by *r, *u, *k or *i.

Common grammatical innovations
Old Prussian, however, has another ending, perhaps stemming from the original PIE genitive: deiwas "god's", tawas "father's".
 Use of the ending *-ān (from earlier *-āmi) of the instrumental singular in ā-stem nouns and adjectives. This contrasts with Sanskrit -ayā, archaic Vedic -ā. Lithuanian rankà is ambiguous and could have originated from either ending, but the correspondence with East Lithuanian runku and Latvian rùoku point to Balto-Slavic *-ān.
 Use of the ending *-mis in the instrumental plural, e.g. Lithuanian sūnumìs, Old Church Slavonic synъmi "with sons". This ending is also found in Germanic, while the other Indo-European languages have an ending with -bʰ-, as in Sanskrit .
 Creation of a distinction between definite (meaning similar to "the") and indefinite adjectives (meaning similar to "a"). The definite forms were formed by attaching the corresponding form of the relative/demonstrative pronoun *jas to the end of the adjective. For example, Lithuanian geràsis 'the good' as opposed to gẽras 'good', Old Church Slavonic dobrъjь 'the good' as opposed to dobrъ 'good'. These forms in Lithuanian, however, seem to have developed after the split, since in older Lithuanian literature (16th century and onwards) they had not yet merged (e. g. naujamę́jame ʽin the new one’ from *naujamén + *jamén). In Lithuanian, the pronoun merged with the adjective having a modern (secondary) pronominal inflection; in Slavic, the pronoun merged with an adjective, having an ancient (primary) nominal inflection.
 Usage of the genitive case for the direct object of a negative verb. For example, Russian , Lith. knygos neskaičiau 'I haven't read the book'.

Shared vocabulary
Some examples of words shared among most or all Balto-Slavic languages:

 *léiˀpāˀ 'tilia' (linden tree): Lithuanian líepa, Old Prussian līpa, Latvian liẽpa, Latgalian līpa, Common Slavic *lipa (Old Church Slavonic липа, Russian ли́па, Polish lipa, Czech lípa)
 *ránkāˀ 'hand': Lithuanian rankà, Old Prussian rānkan (acc. sg.), Latvian rùoka, Latgalian rūka, Common Slavic *rǭkà (Old Church Slavonic рѫка, Russian рука́, Polish ręka, Czech ruka)
 *galˀwā́ˀ 'head': Lithuanian galvà, Old Prussian galwo, Latvian gal̂va, Latgalian golva; Common Slavic *golvà (Old Church Slavonic глава, Russian голова́, Polish głowa, Czech hlava, Slavic Triglav 'three-headed/three-faced' god).

Despite lexical developments exclusive to Balto-Slavic and otherwise showing evidence for a stage of common development, there are considerable differences between the vocabularies of Baltic and Slavic. Rozwadowski noted that every semantic field contains core vocabulary that is etymologically different between the two branches. Andersen prefers a dialect continuum model where the northernmost dialects developed into Baltic and the southernmost dialects into Slavic (with Slavic later absorbing any intermediate idioms during its expansion). Andersen thinks that different neighboring and substratum languages might have contributed to the differences in basic vocabulary.

Criticism

Phonetics and phonology 
Lithuanian linguist and scholar Antanas Klimas has criticized Oswald Szemerényi's arguments, which are in favour of the Balto-Slavic theory. His counterarguments regarding the plausible phonetic, phonological and morphological similarities between the Baltic and Slavic languages had scrutinized the arguments of O. Szemerényi and concluded the following: 

 Phonetic palatalization only exists in Latvian and not Lithuanian or Old Prussian. This means phonetic palatalization couldn’t have existed in the Proto-Balto-Slavic language.
 The changes of *ṛ, *ḷ, *ṃ, *ṇ  liquid consonants also apply to Germanic languages, so these changes are not unique to Baltic or Slavic languages.
 The idea of Proto-Slavic language being an offshoot of Western Baltic language group cannot be true due to the fact that *s reflexes present in Lithuanian, Latvian, and Old Prussian that come after *r, *u, *k, *i and become *š began to merge with satem consonants, thus leading to the strengthening of consonants *k and *g. The complete opposite had happened in Slavic, Albanian as well as Armenian languages.
 The consonant *s turning into *č after *r, *u, *k, and *i is a tendency that can be observed in Indo-Iranian languages, Armenian and Albanian.
 In terms of similarity the vowel system of German is almost identical to Old Prussian. Therefore, it is baseless to discuss exclusive similarities between the Proto-Slavic and Old Prussian.
 One could argue that Winter's law is not a phonetic law but merely a characteristic of long vowels, which differ between the Baltic and Slavic languages.
He had also noted that:

 In the Baltic languages short vowels *a, *o coincided into a, while in Slavic languages they coincided into o; the differences of long vowels of *ā and *ō in the Baltic languages were maintained, in Slavic languages they ceased to exist.
 Unlike the Proto-Slavic language, which remained conservative, the vowel gradation in the Proto-Baltic language had been developed extensively.
 The law of open syllables applies to the Proto-Slavic language that cannot be found in the Proto-Baltic language or in the Baltic languages in general.
Regarding the systemic changes of suffixes in Baltic and Slavic languages, Russian linguist A. Dubasova notices that in both cases the following happened: aspirated voiced consonants turned into generic voiced consonants (e. g., *gʰ > *g), iotation (e. g., *d > *di̯ > *dj), palatalization, and later on—the assimilation, dissimilation, metathesis as well as the fallout of some consonants in some instances. According to Dubasova, the aforementioned sequence of common changes in both language groups can be an indication of a special relationship between Baltic and Slavic languages but before making such conclusions it is crucial to scrutinize the basis, consequences and intensity of these processes.

For instance, Dubasova emphasizes that there are core differences when it comes to iotation in Baltic and Slavic languages, which is something other scientists had noticed in the past. In fact, there are differences in iotation between Baltic languages themselves, which probably means that this process began after the split of Proto-Baltic while Proto-Slavic is already known to have iotation. With regard to palatalization, Dubasova notices that it is a trivial phonetic change and it cannot be seen as evidence of a genetic link between Baltic and Slavic languages, especially when taking the core palatalization differences in both language groups. She also concludes that researchers face great difficulties when reconstructing the phonological system of the Proto-Baltic mostly due to the problematic nature of examining Old Prussian and contrasting views of researchers.

In terms of palatalization similarities between Latvian and Slavic languages, Dubasova notes that the reasons behind the changes of consonants before certain vowels or the lack of them are different. In her work on the assimilation of voiced and voiceless consonants, she states that such assimilation already happened in the Proto-Slavic language, which was caused by the fallout of reduced vowels, while in the Proto-Baltic language vowel reduction is not being reconstructed. This shows the different nature of assimilation in Baltic languages.

When analyzing the dropping of consonants at the end of a word, she claims that in Proto-Slavic this process was a consequence of a general tendency but in Baltic languages, the endings of consonants were not dropped at all. According to the linguist, metathesis in the Proto-Baltic was an independent phenomenon that, unlike in the case of Proto-Slavic, is not connected with the open syllable principle (in the Baltic languages such a principle did not and does not exist to this day). When evaluating the gemination (the fadeaway of consonant lengthening) Dubasova emphasizes that linguists do not have a consensus on this: some interpret this as an independent process while some believe it to be a common genetic deviation. Dubasova presents the opinions of other specialists about the system of consonants and even though she notes that there is no common ground regarding this, the linguist draws attention to the alveolar and dental consonant differences that Baltic and Slavic languages possess. In conclusion, Dubasova states:The examples of previously discussed factors reveal that Slavic and Baltic languages “had put an emphasis” on different ways of reorganization, and used various [linguistic] tools irregularly; all changes despite their similarities in Baltic and Slavic languages are independent processes, which have a different basis and consequences. So, it is more logical to talk about the independent evolution from the very beginning rather than “separation” without postulating the idea of a common Proto-Balto-Slavic language.

Morphology and syntax 
The opponents of the Balto-Slavic theory had presented morphological properties that, according to them, prove that the Proto-Balto-Slavic language did not exist:

 In the Baltic languages, ordinal numeral first (Lithuanian: pirmas, Latvian: pirmais) is created with a suffix -mo-, whereas in the Slavic languages it is done with a suffix -wo-, as in the Indo-Iranian languages and Tocharian languages.
 In Hittite language as well as the Proto-Slavic language the suffix -es- was used to create names for parts of the body. That is not the case with the Baltic languages.
 The Slavic perfect of the word know *vĕdĕ comes from *u̯oi̯da(i̯), an archaism that has no equivalent in the Baltic languages.
 The Slavic imperative form of the verb go *jьdi is the continuation of *i-dhí, something that cannot be found in the Baltic languages.
 The Slavic suffix of the verb noun -telь- is related to -talla found in the Hittite language and is not used in the Baltic languages.
 The equivalents of the Slavic participle with the suffix -lъ can be found in Armenian and Tocharian languages but not in the Baltic ones.
 The Baltic first person singular verb ending -mai does not exist in the Slavic languages.
 The common Baltic verb suffix -sto- does not exist in the Slavic languages.
 The common Baltic adjective suffix -ing- does not exist in the Slavic languages.
 The Baltic diminutive suffix -l- is not used in the Slavic languages.
 The Proto-Baltic language did not have separate singular and plural third person verb forms. Proto-Slavic had retained this property.
 The Slavic languages reflect well the thematic verbs of the 3rd person formants -t: -nt, something that cannot be found in the Baltic languages.
 Unlike the Slavic languages, the Baltic languages use the suffix -no- to form participles.
 Unlike the Baltic languages, the Proto-Slavic language had a sigmatic aorist with the suffix -s-.
 Unlike the Slavic languages, the Baltic languages use the sigmatic future tense.
 The Proto-Slavic language uses suffix -tь with plural quantitative numericals (e.g.,*pę-tь 5, *šes-tь 6, *devę-tь 9), something that cannot be found in the Baltic languages.

Lexicon and semantics 
According to the Russian linguist S. Bernstein, when examining the lexicon of both language groups, it is important to separate the common heritage and vocabulary innovations of the Proto-Indo-European language from the ones that formed during the contact of Baltic and Slavic languages, which is something Reinhold Trautmann had failed to do. In his Balto-Slavic Dictionary (German: Baltisch–slavisches Wörterbuch), published in 1923, Trautmann presents 1,700 common words but more than 75% of the given vocabulary is not unique to Baltic and Slavic languages as these words can be found in other Indo-European languages, they unite only some of the Baltic or Slavic languages or only belong to one specific language.

The opposing linguists of the genetic relationship between Baltic and Slavic languages like Oleg Trubachyov also note that there are notable lexicon and semantic differences that date back to very old times. They emphasize that the most important concepts such as egg, to beat, suffering, girl, oak, chop, pigeon, god, guest, or forger are named differently in Baltic and Slavic languages. According to the Lithuanian linguist Zigmas Zinkevičius, the Baltic and Slavic dictionary of differences would be much more impressive than a dictionary of commonalities.

In his study Traces of Stem Roots in Slavic Languages published in 1903, Alexander Pogodin regarded Proto-Balto-Slavic as science fiction. In 1908, Antoine Meillet published a book called Indo-European Dialects (French: Les dialectes indo-europeens) where he deconstructed the arguments made by Karl Brugman regarding the existence of the Proto-Balto-Slavic by presenting eight counterarguments and formulating a conception on independent Baltic and Slavic linguistic development.

See also
 Corded Ware culture
 International Workshop on Balto-Slavic Accentology
 List of Balto-Slavic languages
 Outline of Slavic history and culture

Notes

References

 
 
 
 
 
 
 
 
 
 
 
 
 
 
 
 
 
 
 
 
 
 
  Thomas Olander's master's thesis on the existence of Balto-Slavic genetic node solely on the basis of accentological evidence

Further reading
 .
 Matasović, Ranko. "Supstratne riječi u baltoslavenskim jezicima" [Substratum words in Balto-Slavic]. Filologija, br. 60 (2013): 75-102. https://hrcak.srce.hr/116920
 .
 Pronk, Tijmen. “Balto-Slavic”. In: The Indo-European Language Family: A Phylogenetic Perspective. Edited by Thomas Olander. Cambridge: Cambridge University Press, 2022. pp. 269–92. .

External links
 Balto-Slavic Accentuation, by Kortlandt; a very idiosyncratic approach to Balto-Slavic accentuation
  (Bernstein and Trubachev on the Balto-South-Slavic isoglosses)
 Biennial International Workshop on Balto-Slavic Natural Language Processing

 
Indo-European languages